House on Old Lonesome Road is the  fifty-fourth studio album by American country music singer Conway Twitty. It was released in 1989 on MCA Records, and features the hit "She's Got a Single Thing in Mind", which Allmusic's Jason Ankeny called "the energizing hit which reaffirmed Twitty's standing among the era's country's giants."

"Play, Ruby, Play" was later released as a single by Clinton Gregory.

Track listing

Production 
Produced by Conway Twitty, Dee Henry and Jimmy Bowen
Engineer: Ron Treat
Second engineers: Mark J. Coddington, Tim Kish, Russ Martin
Mixing: Chuck Ainlay
Digital editing: Milan Bogdan
Mastering: Glenn Meadows

Personnel 
Conway Twitty: lead vocals
Billy Joe Walker Jr.: acoustic guitar, electric guitar
Reggie Young: electric guitar
David Hungate: bass guitar
Eddie Bayers: drums
John Barlow Jarvis: keyboards
Mike Lawler: synthesizer
Hoot Hester: fiddle, mandolin
Vince Gill, Conway Twitty, Joe Manuel: harmony vocals

Chart performance

References

1989 albums
MCA Records albums
Conway Twitty albums
Albums produced by Jimmy Bowen